The 1942 Oregon gubernatorial election  took place on November 3, 1942 to elect the governor of the U.S. state of Oregon. Republican candidate and Oregon Secretary of State Earl W. Snell defeated state senator Lew Wallace by a more than 3–1 margin, which remains the largest margin of victory for any candidate for Oregon governor.

Background and campaign
In 1938, Republican Charles A. Sprague had won an easy victory as governor following a divisive Democratic primary which had seen the defeat of the sitting governor, Charles Martin. That same year, Republican Earl Snell had been re-elected to a second term as Secretary of State.

In 1942, Snell was ineligible for another term, and decided to challenge Sprague's re-election effort. Despite the fact that the Oregon legislature was controlled by his own party, Sprague's progressive stance on numerous issues had caused conflict with the legislature, and he had vetoed special interest legislation put forward by members of his own party. An attempted recall of Sprague had been unsuccessful, but Snell used the issue, along with accusations that Sprague's efforts to efficiently organize the state for World War II had been inadequate, to achieve a comfortable victory in the primary.

In the Democratic primary, state senator Lew Wallace defeated former Oregon House speaker Howard LaTourette to win his party's nomination.

In the general election, Snell crushed Wallace by the largest margin of victory ever in an Oregon governor's race, winning at least 70 percent of the vote in every county.

Election results

References

Gubernatorial
1942
Oregon
November 1942 events